Chajlaya is a small town in Bolivia. In 2009 it had an estimated population of 819.

References

Populated places in La Paz Department (Bolivia)